United Nations Security Council resolution 1112, adopted unanimously on 12 June 1997, after recalling 1031 (1995) and 1088 (1996), the Council approved the appointment of Carlos Westendorp as High Representative for Bosnia and Herzegovina.

Recalling the Dayton Agreement, the Council expressed appreciation for the work of Carl Bildt as High Representative and agreed for Carlos Westendorp to succeed him. It reaffirmed the role of the High Representative in monitoring the implementation of the Dayton Agreement and co-ordinating the activities of civilian organisations and agencies that were working to implement the Agreement. Finally, it also reaffirmed the role of the High Representative as the final authority regarding the interpretation of Annex 10 on the civilian implementation of the Peace Agreement.

See also
 Bosnian War
 List of United Nations Security Council Resolutions 1101 to 1200 (1997–1998)
 Yugoslav Wars

References

External links
 
Text of the Resolution at undocs.org

 1112
 1112
1997 in Yugoslavia
1997 in Bosnia and Herzegovina
 1112
High Representatives for Bosnia and Herzegovina
June 1997 events